G. Pat Collins, also known as George Pat Collins or Pat Collins (born George Percy Collins; December 16, 1895 – August 5, 1959) was an American actor of the stage and screen.

Biography
Collins was born in Brooklyn, New York in 1895.

After serving in the United States Army during World War I, Collins began his acting career in the New York theater scene. His first Broadway appearance was in the 1922 play, The Bootleggers, a short-lived comedy which was produced at the 39th Street Theatre in November and December of that year. He would appear in ten plays between 1922 and 1938.

His film career would last slightly longer, mostly as a character actor or in smaller roles, from 1928 through 1958, during which time he appeared in over 100 films. Collins often played earnest roles like police or military officers. His first film was a silent picture, the 1928 film, The Racket, which stars Louis Wolheim, and in which Collins had a featured role. It would be the only silent film he would make. Two years later, in 1930, Collins would have a featured role in another film with Wolheim, the classic All Quiet on the Western Front.

In 1922 he would marry the silent film actress, Billie Rhodes, and the two would remain married until Collins death. After finishing work on They Died With Their Boots On, in which he had a small role, Collins took a break from the film industry, and at the age of 47 re-enlisted in the armed services for the duration of World War II. He would return to films with a small role in 1947's Easy Come, Easy Go. Collins would continue to act in films through 1958, mostly in supporting and small roles. His final film would be in the Glenn Ford 1958 vehicle, The Sheepman.

He died on August 5, 1959, in Los Angeles, aged 63.

Filmography

(Per AFI database)

The Racket  (1928) as Patrolman Johnson
Half Marriage  (1929) as Detective Bob Mulhall (uncredited)
All Quiet on the Western Front  (1930) as Bertinck
Be Yourself!  (1930) as McCloskey
 Big Money (1930) as Smiley
Manslaughter  (1930) as John Drummond
Only Saps Work  (1930) as Rafferty
The Vice Squad  (1931) as Pete - Detective
The Lawyer's Secret (1931) as Motorcycle Officer (uncredited)
A Woman of Experience  (1931) as Submarine Captain Franz (uncredited)
No Limit  (1931) as Charlie
Wicked  (1931) as Cop #2
I Am a Fugitive from a Chain Gang  (1932) as Wilson (uncredited)
Central Park  (1932) as Gangster Spud (uncredited)
20,000 Years in Sing Sing  (1932) as Mike - Death Row Convict (uncredited)
Hold 'Em Jail  (1932) as Whitey
Girl Missing  (1933) as Crawford
Picture Snatcher  (1933) as Hennessy
The Mayor of Hell  (1933) as Brandon
Heroes for Sale  (1933) as Leader of Agitators
Parachute Jumper  (1933) as om Crowley (uncredited)
The Silk Express  (1933) as Train Guard Harry Burns
Fog  (1933) as Mullaney
He Was Her Man  (1934)
Manhattan Melodrama  (1934) as Killer in Prison (uncredited)
A Very Honorable Guy  (1934) as Red Hendrickson
The Big Shakedown (1934) as Gyp
Keep 'Em Rolling  (1934) as Sergeant Tom Randall
Friends of Mr. Sweeney  (1934) as Soda Jerk (uncredited)
The Personality Kid  (1934) as Ed
The Crime Doctor  (1934) as Walters
The Girl from Missouri  (1934)
The Captain Hates the Sea  (1934) as Donlin
West of the Pecos  (1934) as Sam Sawtelle
Black Fury  (1935) as Lefty - Company Policeman
Alibi Ike  (1935) as Lieutenant
The Case of the Curious Bride  (1935) as Ferry Pilot (uncredited)
Baby Face Harrington  (1935) as Hank
West Point of the Air  (1935) as Lieutenant Kelly
Night Life of the Gods (1935) as Times Square Policeman (uncredited)
People Will Talk  (1935) as Duffy (uncredited)
Mister Dynamite  (1935) as Rod
It Had to Happen  (1936) as Workman (uncredited)
Robin Hood of El Dorado  (1936) as Doc (uncredited)
15 Maiden Lane  (1936) as Fake Detective (uncredited)
Anything Goes  (1936) as Purser (uncredited)
Let's Make a Million  (1936)
Parole!  (1936) as Police Sergeant (uncredited)
With Love and Kisses (1936) as Joe
Souls at Sea  (1937) as Slaver (uncredited)
Carnival Queen  (1937) as Bert MacGregor
Bad Guy  (1937) as Griffith - Prison Electrician (uncredited)
Between Two Women  (1937) as Mr. Hendry (uncredited)
Double Wedding  (1937) as Mounted Policeman (uncredited)
Invisible Stripes  (1939) as Alec - New 'Fish' (uncredited)
Charlie McCarthy, Detective  (1939) as McNeil (uncredited)
Little Old New York  (1940) as Minor Role (uncredited)
Brother Orchid  (1940) as Tim O'Hara (uncredited)
King of the Lumberjacks  (1940) as Mr. Gregg, Parole Officer
Navy Blues  (1941) as Chief Petty Officer (uncredited)
They Died with Their Boots On  (1941) as Corporal (uncredited)
Easy Come, Easy Go  (1947) asDesk Sergeant (uncredited)
Jungle Patrol  (1948) as Sgt. Hanley
The Naked City  (1948) as Charles Meade - Parole Officer (uncredited)
Romance on the High Seas  (1948) as Detective Humphrey (uncredited)
Scudda Hoo! Scudda Hay!  (1948) as Mike Malone (uncredited)
The Snake Pit  (1948) as Attendant (uncredited)
Up in Central Park  (1948) as Ward Heeler (uncredited)
The Dark Past  (1948) as Al's Father (uncredited)
The Clay Pigeon  (1949) as Abbott (uncredited)
Flaming Fury  (1949) as Battalion Fire Chief
The Fountainhead  (1949) asJury Foreman (uncredited)
Scene of the Crime  (1949) as Detective Edward Joseph Monigan (uncredited)
Top o' the Morning  (1949) as Bartender (uncredited)
White Heat  (1949) as The Reader (uncredited)
The Woman on Pier 13  (1949) as Charles Dover
Father Makes Good  (1950) as Mr. Joe Sweeney
Indian Territory  (1950) as Jim Colton
Sideshow  (1950)
Southside 1-1000  (1950) as Hugh B. Pringle - Treasury Agent
Triple Trouble  (1950) as Bat Armstrong
Gambling House  (1950) as Homicide Detective Jenson (uncredited)
The Whip Hand  (1951) as Nelson - Gate Guard (uncredited)
On Dangerous Ground  (1951) as Sgt. Wendell (uncredited)
The Las Vegas Story  (1952) as Stickman (uncredited)
The Pride of St. Louis  (1952) as Marty (uncredited)
French Peep Show  (1952)
Sky Full of Moon  (1952) as Foreman (uncredited)
The Wild North  (1952) as Bartender (uncredited)
Above and Beyond  (1952) as Maj. Gen. Creston (uncredited)
The Clown  (1953) as Actor as the Carpenter (uncredited)
Francis Covers the Big Town  (1953) as Bailiff (uncredited)
The Great Diamond Robbery  (1954) as Nightwatchman Connelly (uncredited)
Three Hours to Kill  (1954) as	Townsman (uncredited)
Betrayed Women  (1955) as Hostage Guard
The Big Tip Off  (1955) as Bartender at Scoop's (uncredited)
The Naked Street  (1955) as Mr. Hough (uncredited)
Night Freight  (1955) as Kelly
Ten Wanted Men  (1955) as Queen Hotel Bartender (uncredited)
The Fastest Gun Alive  (1956)
Yaqui Drums  (1956) as Bartender
Beau James  (1957) as 1st Policeman (uncredited)
Screaming Mimi  (1958) as Elmer - Engineer (uncredited)
The Sheepman  (1958) as Detective Guerney (uncredited)

References

External links

 German Wikipedia article on G. Pat Collins

1895 births
1959 deaths
20th-century American male actors
American male silent film actors
American male film actors
United States Army personnel of World War I
American military personnel of World War II
American male stage actors
Male actors from New York City
Military personnel from New York City